Milton Núñez (born September 25, 1979) is a Colombian middleweight boxer.  Nunez's biggest fight was against Gennadiy Golovkin for the interim WBA middleweight title.  In this title fight, Milton lost by knockout in 58 seconds.

Milton also fought, and lost, against fellow Colombian Nilson Julio Tapia.  Milton fought former IBF light middleweight title challenger Deandre Latimore on Showtime on February 24, 2012 where Milton lost by majority decision.

Other world champion or world title challenger opponents of Milton include Sergio Mora, Daniel Jacobs, Dmitry Chudinov, and Matt Korobov – all ending in losses.

References

External links

Middleweight boxers
1987 births
Living people
Colombian male boxers
Sportspeople from Barranquilla
20th-century Colombian people
21st-century Colombian people